Samantha Agazuma (born 14 July 1994) is a Nigerian cricketer and the current captain of the Nigeria women's cricket team. Agazuma first began to play cricket as a student at Ambrose Alli University.

In January 2019, Agazuma was named in Nigeria's squad for their first ever Women's Twenty20 International (WT20I) matches, against Rwanda. Agazuma made her WT20I debut on 26 January 2019, for Nigeria against Rwanda at the National Stadium in Abuja, but only scored one run. In May 2019, Agazuma was named in Nigeria's squad for the 2019 ICC Women's Qualifier Africa tournament in Zimbabwe. In September 2019, Agazuma was named captain of the Nigerian team for the first time, for the return leg of their bilateral tour against Rwanda. In May 2021, Agazuma was again named as the captain of the Nigerian team, this time for the 2021 Kwibuka Women's T20 Tournament in Rwanda.

References

1994 births
Living people
Nigerian cricketers
Nigeria women Twenty20 International cricketers
Place of birth missing (living people)
Women cricket captains